Tagraxofusp, sold under the brand name Elzonris, is an anti-cancer medication for the treatment of blastic plasmacytoid dendritic cell neoplasm (BPDCN).  It was approved for use in the United States in 2018, and after a second review, in the EU in January 2021.  The U.S. Food and Drug Administration (FDA) considers it to be a first-in-class medication.

Tagraxofusp is a fusion protein consisting of interleukin 3 (IL-3) fused to diphtheria toxin. The fusion protein readily kills cultured pDC by binding to their IL-3 receptors to thereby gain entrance to the cells and then blocking these cells' protein synthesis (due to its diphtheria toxin portion inhibiting eukaryotic elongation factor 2).

Society and culture

Legal status 
In July 2020, the European Medicines Agency (EMA) recommended the refusal of the marketing authorization for tagraxofusp. The Agency was concerned that due to the design of the study and the small number of participants, it was not possible to be sure how effective the medicine was in treating blastic plasmacytoid dendritic cell neoplasm. In addition, the medicine could cause capillary leak syndrome (an unpredictable, potentially life-threatening side effect due to increased permeability of small blood vessels), which had led to some fatal outcomes.

On 12 November 2020, the Committee for Medicinal Products for Human Use (CHMP) of the EMA adopted a positive opinion following a re-examination procedure,  recommending the granting of a marketing authorization for the medicinal product Elzonris, intended for the treatment of blastic plasmacytoid dendritic cell neoplasm (BPDCN). Tagraxofusp was approved for medical use in the European Union in January 2021.

References

External links 
 
 
 

Cancer treatments
Engineered proteins
Orphan drugs